Myanma Oil and Gas Enterprise (abbreviated MOGE) is a national oil and gas company of Myanmar. It was established in 1963. MOGE royalties and fees are estimated to generate $1.5 billion USD in annual revenues, about half of the country's foreign currency reserves.

History
Myanma Oil and Gas Enterprise was established in 1963 after nationalisation of the Burmese petroleum industry. The nationalised assets of Burmah Oil Company were amalgamated to MOGE .

Myanma discovered the Mann oil field in 1970. Peak production in 1979 was 23,000 barrels of oil per day, about three-quarters of Myanmar's total production.

The company is a sole operator of oil and gas exploration and production, as well as domestic gas transmission through a  onshore pipeline grid.

MOGE is a partner in the Yadana natural gas pipeline project, operated by Total S.A., a French energy group. Other partners in the project include; Chevron Corporation, a United States-based company; PTT, a Thai state-owned oil and gas company. The stakeholders and their respective stakes in the project are:
 Total S.A.: 31.2%
 Chevron Corporation: 28.3%
 PTT Public Company Limited: 25.5%
 Myanma Oil and Gas Enterprise: 15%
MOGE is also working in Partnership with Woodside Energy and Australian Energy Company on further development around the Shwe Platform

See also
 Burmah Oil
 Burmah Castrol
 Padma Oil Company (formerly Burmah Eastern)

References

External links
 Myanma Oil and Gas Enterprise (Ministry of Energy website)

Oil and gas companies of Myanmar
National oil and gas companies
Burmah-Castrol
Energy companies established in 1963
Non-renewable resource companies established in 1963
1963 establishments in Burma
Government-owned companies of Myanmar
Entities related to Myanmar sanctions